The graytail skate (Bathyraja griseocauda), or gray tail skate, is a large species of skate in the family Arhynchobatidae, native to the south-western Atlantic Ocean and south-eastern Pacific Ocean.  It is listed as endangered by the IUCN. It was caught as part of a commercial fishery around the Falkland Islands and is a bycatch in several other fisheries.

Range and distribution 

In the Atlantic Ocean, the graytail skate is found off the coast of Argentina and in the waters surrounding the Falkland Islands.  The northern extent of its range in the Atlantic is 37 degrees South.  Its range extends very slightly past Cape Horn into the Pacific Ocean, off the coast of Chile, but does not extend beyond a northern extent of 41 degrees South.

They are found all over the continental shelf surrounding the Falkland Islands, but are found in highest concentration in the western, deeper shelf margin.

Individuals also segregate spatially by age class. Nursery grounds near the Falkland Islands are generally located at depths of 300-350m.

The current population size of the graytail skate is not known.  However the catch per unit effort has declined from 1993-2001, as well as a decrease in size.  These indicators led to the partial closure of the fishery around the Falklands, although no assessments have been completed to gauge current status. The frequency of bycatch and slow growth rate have led fisheries scientists to believe the fisheries restriction has not reversed the decline.

Biology and description 
An earlier study found mature individuals to be considerably smaller. The dorsal surface is black-brown and is covered by denticles but lacks spines. The ventral surface is yellowish with dark spots near the tail. The tail has 19-27 large spines.

This is slower than most species in the genus Bathyraja. The maximum observed age is 28 years. Sexual maturity is reached at approximately 18 years for females and 14 years for males. The sex ratio is slightly skewed toward female.

Like most skates, the graytail skate is oviparious, laying paired eggs with horn-like projections.  It spawns year-round, although lays fewer eggs in the winter.

Younger individuals eat primarily amphipods and other crustaceans and polychaete worms.  These disappear from the diet as the individual ages.  Older individuals eat rajids, ray-finned fish, and cephalopods.

Taxonomy 
Initially classified in the genus Raja, the graytail skate was reclassified as Bathyraja in 1971, a genus which did not exist in 1947. This classification was supported by a morphological phylogenetic analysis and genetically.  It is closely related to the butterfly skate, Bathyraja papilionifera, based on similarity of mtDNA fragments from Cytochrome c oxidase subunit I.

Fisheries 
The graytail skate was the largest component of the rajid catch in the Falkland Island from 1993 to 2001.  It comprised 24.2% of the harvest, followed by the white-dotted skate, B. albomaculata, and the broadnose skate, B. brachyurops.  It is also a bycatch in trawler fisheries targeting teleosts, and long line fisheries targeting patagonian toothfish.  Fisheries may be based in the Falkland Islands, Argentina, or Chile.

Management 
The Falkland Islands instituted a management plan in 1994.  The plan identifies two mix-species fisheries, one north and one south of the Falklands.  Fishing for rajids in the north requires a license, while it has been prohibited in the south since 1996.  As of 2005, Argentina had not instituted an elasmobranch management plan.

References 

Bathyraja
Taxa named by John Roxborough Norman
Fish described in 1937
Fish of Argentina
Fish of Chile